Pollex abovia is a moth of the family Erebidae first described by Michael Fibiger in 2007. It is known from northern Sumatra.

References

Micronoctuini
Moths described in 2007